Ravy Truchot is a French entrepreneur, owner & investor in the technology, digital, lifestyle and sport industries. Truchot is most famous for having co-founded Gleeden, an extra-marital dating website for married and unfaithful people. Born in France, Truchot oversees his operations in Miami, New York, Geneva and Paris.

Strive Football Group 

Ravy Truchot is the founder and owner of Strive Football Group, that operates several football-related initiatives globally, ranging from teams to academies to sports marketing activities and venture capital.

ACADEMIES  
At the core of Strive Football Group are several football academies and football player development centers, since the opening of its first academy in 2014.

International Center of European Football 

The International Center of European Football (ICEF) has campuses in Europe (HQ), North America, the Middle East (2022) and Asia (2021).

Paris Saint-Germain Academy North America 

Since 2015, Truchot is the President & Owner of Paris Saint-Germain Academy North America, affiliates of Paris Saint-Germain F.C., the official football club of Paris, France. Paris Saint-Germain Academy North America represents the official academies of Paris Saint-Germain in the U.S., Canada and the Caribbean Islands.

Paris Saint-Germain Academy Switzerland 

Since 2019, Truchot owns the Paris Saint-Germain Academy Switzerland.

Paris Saint-Germain Academy PRO

CLUBS 
Strive Football Group currently owns and operates two clubs on two continents: Grand Genève FC competing at the national level in Europe and FC Miami City, the official USL League Two team of Miami, in North America.

FC Miami City 

Since 2014, Truchot owns FC Miami City, Miami's official football team playing in the USL LeagueTwo<.

Grand Geneve Football 

In September 2017, Truchot acquired the Grand Genève Football, also referred to as Thonon Évian Savoie Football Club. Formerly known as Évian Thonon Gaillard Football Club, the club is the former professional football entity in the Greater Geneva area. The club started fresh in 2017, with a new name: Thonon Evian Grand Geneve FC.

Strive Agency

Strive Capital 

Strive Capital is the venture capital division of Strive Football Group, financially investing in sports clubs, professionals, brands, and organizations.

Tech & Digital 
After his experiences with Amadeus, Microsoft and other technology startups, Truchot started his own startups in 2003.

SkyRecon Systems 

Under his direction, SkyRecon Systems  and its main product, Stormshield, rose as the leading global provider of endpoint protection platforms. Following its initial success, SkyRecon raised 12 million dollars in two rounds of funding. In 2009, SkyRecon Systems was sold to Airbus Group. Stormshield is now one of the main products of the cyber security division of Airbus Group.

BlackDivine Group 
In 2009, Truchot launched BlackDivine, an internet company and venture capital seed fund  managing brands, including Touchvibes, WeAreReputation, UGotAWish, ToysLegend, CheckHimOut, StyleRecovery and Gleeden. After gathering millions of customers and users, some companies and investments were sold.

References

1972 births
Living people